The Government of National Unity refers to Zimbabwe's coalition government that was formed on 13 February 2009 following the inaugurations of Morgan Tsvangirai as Prime Minister and Thokozani Khuphe and Arthur Mutambara as Deputy Prime Ministers. It is a coalition organized among President Robert Mugabe's Zimbabwe African National Union – Patriotic Front, Tsvangirai's Movement for Democratic Change, and Mutambara's MDC, as agreed to during recent negotiations.

Following the deal's signing, a "sticking point" for the implementation of the agreements in the fourth quarter 2008 was the allocation of Cabinet positions between the two MDC factions and ZANU-PF, particularly the Home Affairs Ministry. It stopped the negotiations' progress until late January 2009, when the MDC-T agreed to share the Ministerial portfolio with ZANU-PF on a rotating basis, as advised by the Southern African Development Community.

Cabinet
The following appointments have been made

*One of the positions of Vice-President was held by Joseph Msika until his death in August 2009. In December 2009, John Nkomo was appointed to that position.

Ministers of State
The following appointments have been made:

Deputy Ministers
The following appointments have been made:

The following were nominated, but not sworn in:
 Deputy Minister of Agriculture - Roy Bennett (MDC-T)

See also
History of Zimbabwe

References

Coalition governments
Government of Zimbabwe
2009 establishments in Zimbabwe
Cabinets established in 2009
2008 Zimbabwean general election